Vladimir Yuryevich Bartasevich (born 28 July 1993) is a Russian football defender. He plays for FC Chertanovo Moscow in Russian Football National League 2.

Club career
He made his debut in the Russian Second Division for FC Oktan Perm on 21 July 2012 in a game against FC Tyumen.
His first FNL game against FC Rotor Volgograd on 17 July 2018 was also the debut of Chertanovo in Russian First Division.

References

External links
 Career summary by sportbox.ru

1993 births
Living people
Association football defenders
Russian footballers
FC Chertanovo Moscow players